White Hall is a city in Washington Township, located in Jefferson County, Arkansas, United States. With a population of 5,526 in the 2010 census, it is included in the Pine Bluff Metropolitan Statistical Area and the greater Little Rock-North Little Rock-Pine Bluff Combined Statistical Area. White Hall is home to the Pine Bluff Arsenal.

Demographics

2020 census

As of the 2020 United States census, there were 5,581 people, 1,802 households, and 1,322 families residing in the city.

2000 census
As of the census of 2000, there were 4,732 people in 1,780 households, including 1,418 families, in the city. The racial makeup of the city was 92.54% White, 4.65% Black or African American, 0.49% Native American, 1.31% Asian, 0.34% from other races, and 0.68% from two or more races.  1.04% of the population were Hispanic or Latino of any race.

Of the 1,780 households 39.9% had children under the age of 18 living with them, 66.5% were married couples living together, 9.7% had a female householder with no husband present, and 20.3% were non-families. 18.0% of households were one person and 6.6% were one person aged 65 or older.  The average household size was 2.66 and the average family size was 3.02.

The age distribution was 27.5% under the age of 18, 6.9% from 18 to 24, 29.5% from 25 to 44, 26.1% from 45 to 64, and 10.0% 65 or older.  The median age was 37 years. For every 100 females, there were 93.8 males.  For every 100 females age 18 and over, there were 91.7 males.

The median household income was $52,045 and the median family income  was $56,997. Males had a median income of $38,286 versus $26,827 for females. The per capita income for the city was $20,524.  About 5.5% of families and 6.5% of the population were below the poverty line, including 9.4% of those under age 18 and 8.9% of those age 65 or over.

Economy
White Hall has the second highest median household income in Arkansas (after Maumelle).

Arts and culture
The Pine Bluff and Jefferson County Library System operates the White Hall Dr. Cora Economos Library, which is in proximity to the White Hall City Park. Its namesake is the former director of libraries of the library system.

Education
All of White Hall is served by the White Hall School District. White Hall High School is the zoned high school of the district.

See also
 List of municipalities in Arkansas
 National Register of Historic Places listings in Jefferson County, Arkansas

References

Further reading

External links

 
 
 
 White Hall Chamber of Commerce
 White Hall Library at the Pine Bluff and Jefferson County Library System

 
1964 establishments in Arkansas
Cities in Arkansas
Cities in Jefferson County, Arkansas
Cities in Pine Bluff metropolitan area
Populated places established in 1964